Muchacho (Spanish, 'young man', or 'boy') may refer to:

Arts and entertainment
 Muchacho (album), a 2013 studio album by the American band Phosphorescent
 Muchacho, a 1970 album by Sandro de América
 Muchacho (song), a song by Kings of Leon from the 2016 album Walls
 Muchacho (film), a 1970 film with Olinda Bozán and Sandro de América
 Muchacho, a 2009 novel by LouAnne Johnson

Other uses
 Leonardo Muchacho (born 2000), Brazilian footballer
 2946 Muchachos, minor planet

See also
 
 
 Adiós muchachos (disambiguation)
 Muchacha (disambiguation)
 Chacho (disambiguation)